A transgender person (often abbreviated to trans person) is someone whose gender identity or gender expression does not correspond with their sex assigned at birth. Many experience gender dysphoria, which they seek to alleviate through transitioning, often adopting a different name and set of pronouns in the process. They may undergo sex reassignment therapies such as hormone therapy and sex reassignment surgery to more closely align their primary and secondary sex characteristics with their gender identity. Not all transgender people desire these treatments and others may be unable to access them for financial or medical reasons. Those who do desire to medically transition to another sex may identify as transsexual.

Transgender is an umbrella term. In addition to trans men and trans women, it may also include people who are non-binary or genderqueer. Other definitions of transgender also include people who belong to a third gender, or else conceptualize transgender people as a third gender, and the term may be defined very broadly to include cross-dressers.

Gender identity is distinct from sexual orientation, and transgender people may be of any sexual orientation. The opposite of transgender is cisgender, which describes people whose gender identity matches their assigned sex.

Statistics on the number of transgender people vary widely, in part due to differing definitions of transgender. Some countries, such as Canada, collect census data on transgender people. Transgender identity is generally found in less than 1% of the worldwide population, with figures ranging from <0.1% to 0.6%.

Many transgender people face discrimination in the workplace, in accessing public accommodations, and in healthcare. In many places, they are not legally protected from discrimination.

Terminology 
Before the mid-20th century various terms were used within and beyond Western medical and psychological sciences to identify persons and identities labeled transsexual, and later transgender from mid-century onward. Imported from the German and ultimately modelled after German Transsexualismus (coined in 1923), the English term transsexual has enjoyed international acceptability, though transgender (1965, by J. Oliven) has been increasingly preferred over transsexual. The word transgender acquired its modern umbrella term meaning in the 1990s.

Transgender 
Psychiatrist John F. Oliven of Columbia University coined the term transgender in his 1965 reference work Sexual Hygiene and Pathology, writing that the term which had previously been used, transsexualism, "is misleading; actually, 'transgenderism' is meant, because sexuality is not a major factor in primary transvestism." The term transgender was then popularized with varying definitions by various transgender, transsexual, and transvestite people, including Virginia Prince, who used it in the December 1969 issue of Transvestia, a national magazine for cross-dressers she founded. By the mid-1970s both trans-gender and trans people were in use as umbrella terms, while transgenderist and transgenderal were used to refer to people who wanted to live cross-gender without sex reassignment surgery (SRS). By 1976, transgenderist was abbreviated as TG in educational materials.

By 1984, the concept of a "transgender community" had developed, in which transgender was used as an umbrella term. In 1985, Richard Elkins established the "Trans-Gender Archive" at the University of Ulster. By 1992, the International Conference on Transgender Law and Employment Policy defined transgender as an expansive umbrella term including "transsexuals, transgenderists, cross dressers", and anyone transitioning. Leslie Feinberg's pamphlet, "Transgender Liberation: A Movement Whose Time has Come", circulated in 1992, identified transgender as a term to unify all forms of gender nonconformity; in this way transgender has become synonymous with queer. In 1994, gender theorist Susan Stryker defined transgender as encompassing "all identities or practices that cross over, cut across, move between, or otherwise queer socially constructed sex/gender boundaries", including, but not limited to, "transsexuality, heterosexual transvestism, gay drag, butch lesbianism, and such non-European identities as the Native American berdache or the Indian Hijra".

Between the mid-1990s and the early 2000s, the primary terms used under the transgender umbrella were "female to male" (FtM) for men who transitioned from female to male, and "male to female" (MtF) for women who transitioned from male to female. These terms have now been superseded by "trans man" and "trans woman", respectively. This shift in preference from terms highlighting biological sex ("transsexual", "FtM") to terms highlighting gender identity and expression ("transgender", "trans man") reflects a broader shift in the understanding of transgender people's sense of self and the increasing recognition of those who decline medical reassignment as part of the transgender community.

 is a term for any person, binary or non-binary, who was assigned male at birth and has a predominantly feminine gender identity or presentation; transmasculine is the equivalent term for someone who was assigned female at birth and has a predominantly masculine gender identity or presentation.

Transgendered is a common term in older literature; many within the transgender community now deprecate it on the basis that transgender is an adjective, not a verb. Organizations such as GLAAD and The Guardian also state that transgender should never be used as a noun (e.g., "Max is transgender" or "Max is a transgender man", not "Max is a transgender"). "Transgender" is also a noun for the broader topic of transgender identity and experience.

Although the term "transgenderism" was once considered acceptable, it has come to be viewed as offensive, according to GLAAD. In 2020 the International Journal of Transgenderism changed its name to the International Journal of Transgender Health "to reflect a change toward more appropriate and acceptable use of language in our field."

Health-practitioner manuals, professional journalistic style guides, and LGBT advocacy groups advise the adoption by others of the name and pronouns identified by the person in question, including present references to the transgender person's past.

In contrast, people whose sense of personal identity corresponds to the sex and gender assigned to them at birth – that is, those who are neither transgender nor non-binary or genderqueer – are called cisgender.

Transsexual 

Inspired by Magnus Hirschfeld's 1923 term seelischer Transsexualismus, the term transsexual was introduced to English in 1949 by David Oliver Cauldwell and popularized by Harry Benjamin in 1966, around the same time transgender was coined and began to be popularized. Since the 1990s, transsexual has generally been used to refer to the subset of transgender people who desire to transition permanently to the gender with which they identify and who seek medical assistance (for example, sex reassignment surgery) with this.

Distinctions between the terms transgender and transsexual are commonly based on distinctions between gender and sex. Transsexuality may be said to deal more with physical aspects of one's sex, while transgender considerations deal more with one's psychological gender disposition or predisposition, as well as the related social expectations that may accompany a given gender role. Many transgender people reject the term transsexual. Christine Jorgensen publicly rejected transsexual in 1979 and instead identified herself in newsprint as trans-gender, saying, "gender doesn't have to do with bed partners, it has to do with identity." Some have objected to the term transsexual on the basis that it describes a condition related to gender identity rather than sexuality. Some transsexual people object to being included in the transgender umbrella.

In his 2007 book Imagining Transgender: An Ethnography of a Category, anthropologist David Valentine asserts that transgender was coined and used by activists to include many people who do not necessarily identify with the term and states that people who do not identify with the term transgender should not be included in the transgender spectrum. Leslie Feinberg likewise asserts that transgender is not a self-identifier (for some people) but a category imposed by observers to understand other people. According to the Transgender Health Program (THP) at Fenway Health in Boston, there are no universally-accepted definitions, and confusion is common because terms that were popular at the turn of the 21st century may now be deemed offensive. The THP recommends that clinicians ask clients what terminology they prefer, and avoid the term transsexual unless they are sure that a client is comfortable with it.

Harry Benjamin invented a classification system for transsexuals and transvestites, called the Sex Orientation Scale (SOS), in which he assigned transsexuals and transvestites to one of six categories based on their reasons for cross-dressing and the relative urgency of their need (if any) for sex reassignment surgery. Contemporary views on gender identity and classification differ markedly from Harry Benjamin's original opinions. Sexual orientation is no longer regarded as a criterion for diagnosis, or for distinction between transsexuality, transvestism and other forms of gender-variant behavior and expression. Benjamin's scale was designed for use with heterosexual trans women, and trans men's identities do not align with its categories.

Non-binary identity 

Some non-binary (or genderqueer) people identify as transgender. These identities are not specifically male or female. They can be agender, androgynous, bigender, pangender, or genderfluid, and exist outside of cisnormativity. Bigender and androgynous are overlapping categories; bigender individuals may identify as moving between male and female roles (genderfluid) or as being both masculine and feminine simultaneously (androgynous), and androgynes may similarly identify as beyond gender or genderless (agender), between genders (intergender), moving across genders (genderfluid), or simultaneously exhibiting multiple genders (pangender). Non-binary gender identities are independent of sexual orientation.

Related identities and practices

Transvestism and cross-dressing 

A transvestite is a person who cross-dresses, or dresses in clothes typically associated with the gender opposite the one they were assigned at birth. The term transvestite is used as a synonym for the term cross-dresser, although cross-dresser is generally considered the preferred term. The term cross-dresser is not exactly defined in the relevant literature. Michael A. Gilbert, professor at the Department of Philosophy, York University, Toronto, offers this definition: "[A cross-dresser] is a person who has an apparent gender identification with one sex, and who has and certainly has been birth-designated as belonging to [that] sex, but who wears the clothing of the opposite sex because it is that of the opposite sex." This definition excludes people "who wear opposite sex clothing for other reasons", such as "those female impersonators who look upon dressing as solely connected to their livelihood, actors undertaking roles, individual males and females enjoying a masquerade, and so on. These individuals are cross dressing but are not cross dressers." Cross-dressers may not identify with, want to be, or adopt the behaviors or practices of the opposite gender and generally do not want to change their bodies medically or surgically. The majority of cross-dressers identify as heterosexual.

The term transvestite and the associated outdated term transvestism are conceptually different from the term transvestic fetishism, as transvestic fetishist refers to those who intermittently use clothing of the opposite gender for fetishistic purposes. In medical terms, transvestic fetishism is differentiated from cross-dressing by use of the separate codes 302.3 in the Diagnostic and Statistical Manual of Mental Disorders (DSM) and F65.1 in the ICD.

Drag 

Drag is clothing and makeup worn on special occasions for performing or entertaining, unlike those who are transgender or who cross-dress for other reasons. Drag performance includes overall presentation and behavior in addition to clothing and makeup. Drag can be theatrical, comedic, or grotesque. Drag queens have been considered caricatures of women by second-wave feminism. Drag artists have a long tradition in LGBT culture.

Generally the term drag queen covers men doing female drag, drag king covers women doing male drag, and faux queen covers women doing female drag. Nevertheless, there are drag artists of all genders and sexualities who perform for various reasons. Drag performers are not inherently transgender. Some drag performers, transvestites, and people in the gay community have embraced the pornographically-derived term tranny for drag queens or people who engage in transvestism or cross-dressing; this term is widely considered an offensive slur if applied to transgender people.

History 

Transgender people have existed since ancient times. A wide range of societies had traditional third gender roles, or otherwise accepted trans people in some form. A precise history is difficult because the modern concept of being transgender, and gender in general, did not develop until the mid-1900s. Historical understandings are thus inherently filtered through modern principles, and were largely viewed through a medical lens until the late 1900s.

Ancient Greek Hippocrates (interpreting the writing of Herodotus) describes the "disease of the Scythians" (regarding the Enaree), which he attributes to impotency due to riding on a horse without stirrups. This reference was well discussed by medical writings of the 1500s1700s. Pierre Petit writing in 1596 viewed the "Scythian disease" as natural variation, but by the 1700s writers viewed it as a "melancholy", or "hysterical" psychiatric disease. By the early 1800s, being transgender separate from Hippocrates' idea of it was claimed to be widely known, but remained poorly documented. Both trans women and trans men were cited in European insane asylums of the early 1800s. One of the earliest recorded transgender people in America was Thomas(ine) Hall, a seventeenth century colonial servant. The most complete account of the time came from the life of the Chevalier d'Éon (17281810), a French diplomat. As cross-dressing became more widespread in the late 1800s, discussion of transgender people increased greatly and writers attempted to explain the origins of being transgender. Much study came out of Germany, and was exported to other Western audiences. Cross-dressing was seen in a pragmatic light until the late 1800s; it had previously served a satirical or disguising purpose. But in the latter half of the 1800's, cross-dressing and being transgender became viewed as an increasing societal danger.

William A. Hammond wrote an 1882 account of transgender Pueblo shamans (mujerados), comparing them to the Scythian disease. Other writers of the late 1700s and 1800s (including Hammond's associates in the American Neurological Association) had noted the widespread nature of transgender cultural practices among native peoples. Explanations varied, but authors generally did not ascribe native transgender practices to psychiatric causes, instead condemning the practices in a religious and moral sense. Native groups provided much study on the subject, and perhaps the majority of all study until after WWII.

Critical studies first began to emerge in the late 1800s in Germany, with the works of Magnus Hirschfeld. Hirschfeld coined the term "transvestite" in 1910 as the scope of transgender study grew. His work would lead to the 1919 founding of the Institut für Sexualwissenschaft in Berlin. Though Hirscheld's legacy is disputed, he revolutionized the field of study. The Institut was destroyed when the Nazis seized power in 1933, and its research was infamously burned in the May 1933 Nazi book burnings. Transgender issues went largely out of the public eye until after World War II. Even when they re-emerged, they reflected a forensic psychology approach, unlike the more sexological that had been employed in the lost German research.

Sexual orientation 

Gender, gender identity, and being transgender are distinct concepts from sexual orientation. Sexual orientation is an individual's enduring pattern of attraction to others (being straight, lesbian, gay, bisexual, asexual, etc.), whereas gender identity is a person's innate knowledge of their own gender (being a man, woman, non-binary, etc.). Transgender people can have any orientation, and generally use labels corresponding to their gender, rather than assigned sex at birth. For example, trans women who are exclusively attracted to other women commonly identify as lesbians, and trans men exclusively attracted to women would identify as straight. Many trans people describe their sexual orientation as queer, in addition to or instead of, other terms.

For much of the 20th century, transgender identity was conflated with homosexuality and transvestism. In earlier academic literature, sexologists used the labels homosexual and heterosexual transsexual to categorize transgender individuals' sexual orientation based on their birth sex. Critics consider these terms "heterosexist", "archaic", and demeaning. Newer literature often uses terms such as attracted to men (androphilic), attracted to women (gynephilic), attracted to both (bisexual), or attracted to neither (asexual) to describe a person's sexual orientation without reference to their gender identity. Therapists are coming to understand the necessity of using terms with respect to their clients' gender identities and preferences.

The 2015 U.S. Transgender Survey reported that of the 27,715 transgender and non-binary respondents, 21% said queer best described their sexual orientation, 18% said pansexual, 16% said gay, lesbian, or same-gender-loving, 15% said straight, 14% said bisexual, and 10% said asexual. A 2019 Canadian survey of 2,873 trans and non-binary people found that 51% described their sexual orientation as queer, 13% as asexual, 28% as bisexual, 13% as gay, 15% as lesbian, 31% as pansexual, 8% as straight or heterosexual, 4% as two-spirit, and 9% as unsure or questioning.

LGBT community 
Despite the distinction between sexual orientation and gender, throughout history the gay, lesbian, and bisexual (LGBT) subculture was often the only place where gender-variant people were socially accepted in the gender role they felt they belonged to; especially during the time when legal or medical transitioning was almost impossible. This acceptance has had a complex history. Like the wider world, the gay community in Western societies did not generally distinguish between sex and gender identity until the 1970s, and often perceived gender-variant people more as homosexuals who behaved in a gender-variant way than as gender-variant people in their own right. In addition, the role of the transgender community in the history of LGBT rights is often overlooked.

Healthcare

Mental healthcare
Most mental health professionals recommend therapy for internal conflicts about gender identity or discomfort in an assigned gender role, especially if one desires to transition. People who experience discord between their gender and the expectations of others or whose gender identity conflicts with their body may benefit by talking through their feelings in depth. Research on gender identity with regard to psychology, and scientific understanding of the phenomenon and its related issues, is relatively new. The term gender incongruence is listed in the ICD by the WHO. In the American (DSM), the term gender dysphoria is listed under code F64.0 for adolescents and adults, and F64.2 for children

France removed gender identity disorder as a diagnosis by decree in 2010, but according to French trans rights organizations, beyond the impact of the announcement itself, nothing changed. In 2017, the Danish parliament abolished the F64 Gender identity disorders. The DSM-5 refers to the topic as gender dysphoria (GD) while reinforcing the idea that being transgender is not considered a mental illness.

Transgender people may meet the criteria for a diagnosis of gender dysphoria "only if [being transgender] causes distress or disability." This distress may manifest as depression or inability to work and form healthy relationships with others. This diagnosis is often misinterpreted as implying that all transgender people suffer from GD, which has confused transgender people and those who seek to either criticize or affirm them. Transgender people who are comfortable with their gender and whose gender is not directly causing inner frustration or impairing their functioning do not suffer from GD. Moreover, GD is not necessarily permanent and is often resolved through therapy or transitioning. Feeling oppressed by the negative attitudes and behaviors of such others as legal entities does not indicate GD. GD does not imply an opinion of immorality; the psychological establishment holds that people with any kind of mental or emotional problem should not receive stigma. The solution for GD is whatever will alleviate suffering and restore functionality; this solution often, but not always, consists of undergoing a gender transition.

Clinical training lacks relevant information needed in order to adequately help transgender clients, which results in a large number of practitioners who are not prepared to sufficiently work with this population of individuals. Many mental healthcare providers know little about transgender issues. Those who seek help from these professionals often educate the professional without receiving help. This solution usually is good for transsexual people but is not the solution for other transgender people, particularly non-binary people who lack an exclusively male or female identity. Instead, therapists can support their clients in whatever steps they choose to take to transition or can support their decision not to transition while also addressing their clients' sense of congruence between gender identity and appearance.

Research on the specific problems faced by the transgender community in mental health has focused on diagnosis and clinicians' experiences instead of transgender clients' experiences. Therapy was not always sought by transgender people due to mental health needs. Prior to the seventh version of the Standards of Care (SOC), an individual had to be diagnosed with gender identity disorder in order to proceed with hormone treatments or sexual reassignment surgery. The new version decreased the focus on diagnosis and instead emphasized the importance of flexibility in order to meet the diverse health care needs of transsexual, transgender, and all gender-nonconforming people.

The reasons for seeking mental health services vary according to the individual. A transgender person seeking treatment does not necessarily mean their gender identity is problematic. The emotional strain of dealing with stigma and experiencing transphobia pushes many transgender people to seek treatment to improve their quality of life, as one trans woman reflected: "Transgendered individuals are going to come to a therapist and most of their issues have nothing to do, specifically, with being transgendered. It has to do because they've had to hide, they've had to lie, and they've felt all of this guilt and shame, unfortunately usually for years!" Many transgender people also seek mental health treatment for depression and anxiety caused by the stigma attached to being transgender, and some transgender people have stressed the importance of acknowledging their gender identity with a therapist in order to discuss other quality-of-life issues. Others regret having undergone the procedure and wish to detransition.

Problems still remain surrounding misinformation about transgender issues that hurt transgender people's mental health experiences. One trans man who was enrolled as a student in a psychology graduate program highlighted the main concerns with modern clinical training: "Most people probably are familiar with the term transgender, but maybe that's it. I don't think I've had any formal training just going through [clinical] programs ... I don't think most [therapists] know. Most therapistsMaster's degree, PhD levelthey've had ... one diversity class on GLBT issues. One class out of the huge diversity training. One class. And it was probably mostly about gay lifestyle." Many health insurance policies do not cover treatment associated with gender transition, and numerous people are under- or uninsured, which raises concerns about the insufficient training most therapists receive prior to working with transgender clients, potentially increasing financial strain on clients without providing the treatment they need. Many clinicians who work with transgender clients only receive mediocre training on gender identity, but introductory training on interacting with transgender people has recently been made available to health care professionals to help remove barriers and increase the level of service for the transgender population. In February 2010, France became the first country in the world to remove transgender identity from the list of mental diseases.

A 2014 study carried out by the Williams Institute (a UCLA think tank) found that 41% of transgender people had attempted suicide, with the rate being higher among people who experienced discrimination in access to housing or healthcare, harassment, physical or sexual assault, or rejection by family. A 2019 follow-up study found that transgender people who wanted and received gender-affirming medical care had substantially lower rates of suicidal thoughts and attempts.

Autism is more common in people who are gender dysphoric. It is not known whether there is a biological basis. This may be due to the fact that people on the autism spectrum are less concerned with societal disapproval, and feel less fear or inhibition about coming out as trans than others.

Physical healthcare 
Medical and surgical procedures exist for transsexual and some transgender people, though most categories of transgender people as described above are not known for seeking the following treatments. Hormone replacement therapy for trans men induces beard growth and masculinizes skin, hair, voice, and fat distribution. Hormone replacement therapy for trans women feminizes fat distribution and breasts. Laser hair removal or electrolysis removes excess hair for trans women. Surgical procedures for trans women feminize the voice, skin, face, Adam's apple, breasts, waist, buttocks, and genitals. Surgical procedures for trans men masculinize the chest and genitals and remove the womb, ovaries, and fallopian tubes. The acronyms "Gender-affirming surgery (GAS)" and "sex reassignment surgery" (SRS) refer to genital surgery. The term "sex reassignment therapy" (SRT) is used as an umbrella term for physical procedures required for transition. Use of the term "sex change" has been criticized for its emphasis on surgery, and the term "transition" is preferred. Availability of these procedures depends on degree of gender dysphoria, presence or absence of gender identity disorder, and standards of care in the relevant jurisdiction.

Trans men who have not had a hysterectomy and who take testosterone are at increased risk for endometrial cancer because androstenedione, which is made from testosterone in the body, can be converted into estrogen, and external estrogen is a risk factor for endometrial cancer.

Detransition

Detransition refers to the cessation or reversal of a sex reassignment surgery or gender transition. Formal studies of detransition have been few in number, of disputed quality, and politically controversial. Estimates of the rate at which detransitioning occurs vary from less than 1% to as high as 13%. Those who undergo sex reassignment surgery have very low rates of detransition or regret.

The 2015 U.S. Transgender Survey collected responses from 27,715 individuals who identified as "transgender, trans, genderqueer, [or] non-binary". 13.1% of respondents who had pursued gender affirmation said they had ever detransitioned, even temporarily. Detransition was associated with assigned male sex at birth, nonbinary gender identity, and bisexual orientation, among other cohorts. Only 5% of detransitioners reporting doing so because gender transition was "not for them"; 82% cited external reason(s), including pressure from others, the difficulties of transition, and discrimination.

Law

Legal procedures exist in some jurisdictions which allow individuals to change their legal gender or name to reflect their gender identity. Requirements for these procedures vary from an explicit formal diagnosis of transsexualism, to a diagnosis of gender identity disorder, to a letter from a physician that attests the individual's gender transition or having established a different gender role. In 1994, the DSM IV entry was changed from "Transsexual" to "Gender Identity Disorder". In many places, transgender people are not legally protected from discrimination in the workplace or in public accommodations. A report released in February 2011 found that 90% of transgender people faced discrimination at work and were unemployed at double the rate of the general population, and over half had been harassed or turned away when attempting to access public services. Members of the transgender community also encounter high levels of discrimination in health care.

Europe 

36 countries in Europe require a mental health diagnosis for legal gender recognition and 20 countries require sterilisation. In April 2017, the European Court of Human Rights ruled that requiring sterilisation for legal gender recognition violates human rights.

Denmark 
Since 2014 it has been possible for adults without the requirement of a psychiatric evaluation, medical or surgical treatment, divorce or castration, to after a six-month 'reflection period' have their social security number changed and legally change gender.

Germany 

In November 2017, the Federal Constitutional Court ruled that the civil status law must allow a third gender option. Thus officially recognising "third sex" meaning that birth certificates will not have blank gender entries for intersex people. The ruling came after an intersex person, who is neither a man nor woman according to chromosomal analysis, brought a legal challenge after attempting to change their registered sex to "inter" or divers.

Canada 

Jurisdiction over legal classification of sex in Canada is assigned to the provinces and territories. This includes legal change of gender classification. On June 19, 2017, Bill C-16, having passed the legislative process in the House of Commons of Canada and the Senate of Canada, became law upon receiving Royal Assent, which put it into immediate force. The law updated the Canadian Human Rights Act and the Criminal Code to include "gender identity and gender expression" as protected grounds from discrimination, hate publications and advocating transgender genocide. The bill also added "gender identity and expression" to the list of aggravating factors in sentencing, where the accused commits a criminal offence against an individual because of those personal characteristics. Similar transgender laws also exist in all the provinces and territories.

United States 

In the United States, transgender people are protected from employment discrimination by Title VII of the Civil Rights Act of 1964. Exceptions apply to certain types of employers, for example, employers with fewer than 15 employees and religious organizations. In 2020, the U.S. Supreme Court affirmed that Title VII prohibits discrimination against transgender people in the case R.G. & G.R. Harris Funeral Homes Inc. v. Equal Employment Opportunity Commission.

Nicole Maines, a trans girl, took a case to Maine's supreme court in June 2013. She argued that being denied access to her high school's women's restroom was a violation of Maine's Human Rights Act; one state judge has disagreed with her, but Maines won her lawsuit against the Orono school district in January 2014 before the Maine Supreme Judicial Court. On May 14, 2016, the United States Department of Education and Department of Justice issued guidance directing public schools to allow transgender students to use bathrooms that match their gender identities.

On June 30, 2016, the United States Department of Defense removed the ban that prohibited transgender people from openly serving in the US military. On July 27, 2017, President Donald Trump tweeted that transgender Americans would not be allowed to serve "in any capacity" in the United States Armed Forces. Later that day, Joint Chiefs of Staff Chairman Joseph Dunford announced, "there will be no modifications to the current policy until the president's direction has been received by the Secretary of Defense and the secretary has issued implementation guidance." Joe Biden later reversed Trump's policy when he became president in 2021.

India 

In April 2014, the Supreme Court of India declared transgender to be a 'third gender' in Indian law. The transgender community in India (made up of Hijras and others) has a long history in India and in Hindu mythology. Justice KS Radhakrishnan noted in his decision that, "Seldom, our society realizes or cares to realize the trauma, agony and pain which the members of Transgender community undergo, nor appreciates the innate feelings of the members of the Transgender community, especially of those whose mind and body disown their biological sex", adding:

Hijras face structural discrimination including not being able to obtain driving licenses, and being prohibited from accessing various social benefits. It is also common for them to be banished from communities.

Religion 

The Catholic Church has been involved in the outreach to LGBT community for several years and continues doing so through Franciscan urban outreach centers, for example, the Open Hearts outreach in Hartford, Connecticut. The Vatican holds that transgender people cannot become godparents and compares transitioning to self-harm.

The Church of England passed a motion at the 2017 General Synod, which would ensure Anglican churches accepted transgender people, even suggesting on their website that transgender people could be gifted a Bible with their new name inscribed to support them.

Feminism 

Feminist views on transgender women have changed over time, but have generally become more positive. Second-wave feminism saw numerous clashes opposed to transgender women, since they were not seen as "true" women, and as invading women-only spaces. Though second-wave feminism argued for the sex and gender distinction, some feminists believed there was a conflict between transgender identity and the feminist cause; e.g., they believed that male-to-female transition abandoned or devalued female identity and that transgender people embraced traditional gender roles and stereotypes. By the emergence of third-wave feminism (around 1990), opinions had shifted to being more inclusive of both trans and gay identities. Fourth-wave feminism (starting around 2012) has been widely trans-inclusive, but trans-exclusive groups and ideas remain as a minority, though one that is especially prominent in the UK. Feminists who do not accept that trans women are women have been labeled "trans-exclusionary radical feminists" (TERFs) or gender-critical feminists by opponents.

Discrimination

Employment discrimination 
Transgender individuals experience significant rates of employment discrimination. Approximately 90% of trans people have encountered some form of harassment or mistreatment in their workplace. Moreover, 47% have experienced some form of adverse employment outcome due to being transgender; of this figure, 44% were passed over for a job, 23% were denied a promotion, and 26% were terminated on the grounds that they were transgender.

Support

Studies in several cultures have found that cisgender women are more likely to be accepting of trans people than cisgender men.

Scientific studies of transsexuality 
A 1996 study of Swedes estimated a ratio of 1.4:1 trans women to trans men for those requesting sex reassignment surgery and a ratio of 1:1 for those who proceeded. A study in 2020 noted that, since 1990, of those seeking sex hormone therapy for gender dysphoria there has been a steady increase in the percentage of trans men, such that they now equal the number of trans women seeking this treatment.

An observational study revealed that transgender people receiving hormone therapy from the Amsterdam University Medical Centre in the Netherlands had higher mortality rates than the general population, and that this did not decrease during the duration of the study (1972 to 2018). Other studies have also found increased mortality in transgender people.

Population figures and prevalence 

Little is known about the prevalence of transgender people in the general population and reported prevalence estimates are greatly affected by variable
definitions of transgender. According to a recent systematic review, an estimated 9.2 out of every 100,000 people have received or requested gender affirmation surgery or transgender hormone therapy; 6.8 out of every 100,000 people have received a transgender-specific diagnoses; and 355 out of every 100,000 people self-identify as transgender. These findings underscore the value of using consistent terminology related to studying the experience of transgender, as studies that explore surgical or hormonal gender affirmation therapy may or may not be connected with others that follow a diagnosis of "transsexualism", "gender identity disorder", or "gender dysphoria", none of which may relate with those that assess self-reported identity. Common terminology across studies does not yet exist, so population numbers may be inconsistent, depending on how they are being counted.

Asia 

In Thailand and Laos, the term kathoey is used to refer to male-to-female transgender people and effeminate gay men. Transgender people have also been documented in Iran, Japan, Nepal, Indonesia, Vietnam, South Korea, Jordan, Singapore, and the greater Chinese region, including Hong Kong, Taiwan, and the People's Republic of China.

The cultures of the Indian subcontinent include a third gender, referred to as hijra in Hindi. In India, the Supreme Court on April 15, 2014, recognized a third gender that is neither male nor female, stating "Recognition of transgenders as a third gender is not a social or medical issue but a human rights issue." In 1998, Shabnam Mausi became the first transgender person to be elected in India, in the central Indian state of Madhya Pradesh.

Europe

European Union 
According to Amnesty International, 1.5 million transgender people live in the European Union, making up 0.3% of the population.

UK
A 2011 survey conducted by the Equality and Human Rights Commission in the UK found that of 10,026 respondents, 1.4% would be classified into a gender minority group. The survey also showed that 1% had gone through any part of a gender reassignment process (including thoughts or actions).

North America

Canada 

The 2021 Canadian census released by Statistics Canada found that 59,460 Canadians (0.19% of the population) identified as transgender.

According to the Survey of Safety in Public and Private Spaces by Statistics Canada in 2018, 0.24% of the Canadian population identified as transgender men, women or non-binary individuals.

United States 
The Social Security Administration has tracked the sex of citizens since 1936. Using this information, along with the Census data, Benjamin Cerf Harris tracked the prevalence of citizens changing to names associated with the opposite sex or changing sex marker. Harris found that such changes had occurred as early as 1936. He estimated that 89,667 individuals included in the 2010 Census had changed to an opposite-gendered name, 21,833 of whom had also changed sex marker. Prevalence in the States varied, from 1.4 to 10.6 per 100,000. While most people legally changed both name and sex, about a quarter of people changed name, and then five years later changed sex. An earlier estimate in 1968, by Ira B. Pauly, estimated that about 2,500 transsexual people were living in the United States, with four times as many trans women as trans men.

One effort to quantify the population in 2011 gave a "rough estimate" that 0.3% of adults in the US are transgender. More recent studies released in 2016 estimate the proportion of Americans who identify as transgender at 0.5 to 0.6%. This would put the total number of transgender Americans at approximately 1.4 million adults.

A survey by the Pew Research Center in 2017 found that American society is divided on "whether it's possible for someone to be a gender different from the sex they were assigned at birth." It states, "Overall, roughly half of Americans (54%) say that whether someone is a man or a woman is determined by the sex they were assigned at birth, while 44% say someone can be a man or a woman even if that is different from the sex they were assigned at birth."

Native American and First Nations 
In what is now the United States and Canada, some Native American and First Nations cultures traditionally recognize the existence of more than two genders, such as the Zuni male-bodied lhamana, the Lakota male-bodied winkte, and the Mohave male-bodied alyhaa and female-bodied hwamee. These traditional people, along with those from other North American Indigenous cultures, are sometimes part of the contemporary, pan-Indian Two-Spirit community. Historically, in most cultures who have alternate gender roles, if the spouse of a third gender person is not otherwise gender variant, they have not generally been regarded as other-gendered themselves, simply for being in a same-sex relationship. In Mexico, the Zapotec culture includes a third gender in the form of the Muxe. Mahu is a traditional third gender in Hawai'i and Tahiti. Mahu are valued as teachers, caretakers of culture, and healers, such as Kapaemahu. Diné (Navajo) have Nádleehi.

Latin America 
In Latin American cultures, a travesti is an individual who has been assigned male at birth and who has a feminine, transfeminine, or "femme" gender identity. Travestis generally undergo hormonal treatment, use female gender expression including new names and pronouns from the masculine ones they were given when assigned a sex, and might use breast implants, but they are not offered or do not desire sex-reassignment surgery. Travesti might be regarded as a gender in itself (a "third gender"), a mix between man and woman ("intergender/androgynes"), or the presence of both masculine and feminine identities in a single person ("bigender"). They are framed as something entirely separate from transgender women, who possess the same gender identity of people assigned female at birth.

Other transgender identities are becoming more widely known, as a result of contact with other cultures of the Western world. These newer identities, sometimes known under the umbrella use of the term "genderqueer", along with the older travesti term, are known as non-binary and go along with binary transgender identities (those traditionally diagnosed under the now obsolete label of "transsexualism") under the single umbrella of transgender, but are distinguished from cross-dressers and drag queens and kings, that are held as nonconforming gender expressions rather than transgender gender identities when a distinction is made.

Deviating from the societal standards for sexual behavior, sexual orientation/identity, gender identity, and gender expression have a single umbrella term that is known as sexodiverso or sexodiversa in both Spanish and Portuguese, with its most approximate translation to English being "queer".

Ancient cultures 

Among the ancient Middle Eastern Akkadian people, a salzikrum was a person who appeared biologically female but had distinct male traits. Salzikrum is a compound word meaning male daughter. According to the Code of Hammurabi, salzikrūm had inheritance rights like that of priestesses; they inherited from their fathers, unlike regular daughters. A salzikrum's father could also stipulate that she inherit a certain amount. In ancient Rome, the Gallae were castrated followers of the Phrygian goddess Cybele and can be regarded as transgender in today's terms.

In early Medina, gender-variant male-to-female Islamic people were acknowledged in the form of the Mukhannathun. Also, in Fa'asamoa traditions, the Samoan culture allows a specific role for male to female transgender individuals as Fa'afafine.

Coming out 

Transgender people vary greatly in choosing when, whether, and how to disclose their transgender status to family, close friends, and others. The prevalence of discrimination and violence (transgender people are 28% more likely to be victims of violence) against transgender persons can make coming out a risky decision. Fear of retaliatory behavior, such as being removed from the parental home while underage, is a cause for transgender people to not come out to their families until they have reached adulthood. Parental confusion and lack of acceptance of a transgender child may result in parents treating a newly revealed gender identity as a "phase" or making efforts to change their children back to "normal" by utilizing mental health services to alter the child's gender identity.

The internet can play a significant role in the coming out process for transgender people. Some come out in an online identity first, providing an opportunity to go through experiences virtually and safely before risking social sanctions in the real world.

Media representation 

As more transgender people are represented and included within the realm of mass culture, the stigma that is associated with being transgender can influence the decisions, ideas, and thoughts based upon it. Media representation, culture industry, and social marginalization all hint at popular culture standards and the applicability and significance to mass culture as well. These terms play an important role in the formation of notions for those who have little recognition or knowledge of transgender people. Media depictions represent only a minuscule spectrum of the transgender group, which essentially conveys that those that are shown are the only interpretations and ideas society has of them.

In 2014, the United States reached a "transgender tipping point", according to Time. At this time, the media visibility of transgender people reached a level higher than seen before. Since then, the number of transgender portrayals across TV platforms has stayed elevated. Research has found that viewing multiple transgender TV characters and stories improves viewers' attitudes toward transgender people and related policies.

Events

International Transgender Day of Visibility 

International Transgender Day of Visibility is an annual holiday occurring on March 31 dedicated to celebrating transgender people and raising awareness of discrimination faced by transgender people worldwide. The holiday was founded by Michigan-based transgender activist Rachel Crandall in 2009.

Transgender Awareness Week 

Transgender Awareness Week is a one-week celebration leading up to Transgender Day of Remembrance. The purpose of Transgender Awareness Week is to educate about transgender and gender non-conforming people and the issues associated with their transition or identity.

Transgender Day of Remembrance 

Transgender Day of Remembrance (TDOR) is held every year on November 20 in honor of Rita Hester, who was killed on November 28, 1998, in an anti-transgender hate crime. It memorializes dead victims of hate crimes and prejudice and raises awareness of hate crimes committed upon living transgender people.

Trans March 

Annual marches, protests or gatherings take place around the world for transgender issues, often taking place during the time of local Pride parades for LGBT people. These events are frequently organised by trans communities to build community, address human rights struggles, and create visibility.

Pride symbols 

A common symbol for the transgender community is the Transgender Pride Flag, which was designed by the American transgender woman Monica Helms in 1999, and was first shown at a pride parade in Phoenix, Arizona, in 2000. The flag consists of five horizontal stripes: light blue, pink, white, pink, and light blue. Helms describes the meaning of the flag as follows:

Other transgender symbols include the butterfly (symbolizing transformation or metamorphosis), and a pink/light blue yin and yang symbol. Several gender symbols have been used to represent transgender people, including ⚥ and ⚧.

See also 

 List of transgender and transsexual fictional characters
 List of transgender people
 List of transgender publications
 List of transgender-related topics
 List of transgender-rights organizations
 List of people killed for being transgender
 Transgender history

Notes

References

Further reading

External links 
 
 
 
 

 
LGBT studies